Blood Moon is a 2014 British Western horror film produced and directed by Jeremy Wooding. The film premiered at the 2014 Film4 FrightFest.

Plot
In 1887, Colorado, three men & two women are traveling on a horse-drawn stagecoach, heading for Denver by way of a nearby mining town. A fourth man, a gunslinger, joins them on the way, his horse having broken its leg.

By the time they arrive at the town, they see that it is deserted, and a blood red moon can be seen in the night sky. During that very night, something sinister is going to happen. They are attacked by two outlaws, who have just robbed a bank & are fleeing the law. But the whole group, robbers & all, are soon under attack by something far deadlier & more terrifying. One by one, they are picked off. Only a few will survive.

Cast

Reception
Zoe Rose Smith of Scream magazine wrote "Blood Moons biggest flaw was that it lacked any real plot line that could have surprised me or possibly made me want to discuss it with someone". Writing for Screen International, Kim Newman called it "a rare serious entry in the 'steak and kidney western' sub-category and combines elements from classic American cowboy films with a Native American spin on the werewolf legend". Phil Wheat of Nerdly called the film "a surprisingly great monster movie", while Jennie Kermode of Eye for Film, who reviewed its DVD release wrote that "[the film] falls short on ambition, but there's still plenty here to enjoy".

A rank of 65 out of a 100 was awarded to Blood Moon by Culture Crypt.

According to Bob Brinkman of the Horror News Network "Blood Moon is truly a great film".

References

External links

2010s Western (genre) horror films
2014 horror films
2010s English-language films
British Western (genre) horror films
Films set in 1887
Films set in Colorado
2010s British films